Anika Schulz (born ) was a German female volleyball player. She is retired. She was part of the German women's national volleyball team.

She competed with the national team at the 2003 FIVB World Grand Prix, and won the bronze medal at the 2003 Women's European Volleyball Championship in Ankara.

Clubs
Schulz played for Schweriner SC since 1999 in the Bundesliga squad. She won in 2000, 2001 and 2002 the German championship and in 2001 the DVV Cup. 
In 2005, she moved to league rivals 1. VC Wiesbaden. 
Since 2008, she plays for the Swiss first division Volley Köniz, with whom she won the Swiss championship in 2009.

References

External links
 Player profile CEV
 Player profile FIVB
 

1983 births
Living people
German women's volleyball players
Place of birth missing (living people)